Acacia toondulya is a tree belonging to the genus Acacia and the subgenus Phyllodineae native to southern Australia.

Description
The glabrous branchlets are coated in a fine white powder and are angled at extremities. Like most species of Acacia it has phyllodes rather than true leaves. It blooms between June and September and produces axillary inflorescences located on the  racemes or panicles with spherical to obloid flower-heads that contain 80 to 106 densely packed yellow flowers. Following flowering seed pods form that have a narrowly oblong shape and are raised over the seeds.

Distribution
It is endemic only in a small area in South Australia from south western parts of the Gawler Range in the north and on the Eyre Peninsula in the south to around the southern parts of the Tothill Ranges in the south where it is found on rocky hills. It is found from Toondulya Bluff in the west to around the hills near Hiltaba in the east and down to Lake Acraman in the south where it is found on low rocky hills composed of granite and shale growing in loamy soils as a part of open shrubland and Triodia grassland communities.

See also
 List of Acacia species

References

toondulya
Flora of South Australia
Plants described in 2002
Gawler bioregion